The Indian state of Telangana was officially formed on 2 June 2014. Since then, elections in the state are conducted in accordance with the Constitution of India to elect representatives of various bodies on national, state and district levels.

National level

Lok Sabha

Telangana has 17 Lok Sabha constituencies of which 3 are reserved for Scheduled Castes (SC) and 2 for Scheduled Tribes (ST) from which electors have direct election to choose their desired candidate to make them Member of Parliament (MP). Lok Sabha elections have been held in Telangana only once, during the 2019 Indian general election.

Rajya Sabha

The members of Rajya Sabha are elected indirectly, through the MLAs. Telangana sends 7 members to Rajya Sabha, elected through its legislative assembly and legislative council. Before the bifurcation of states, the combined state of Andhra Pradesh used to represent 18 seats to Rajya Sabha. Post bifurcation, Andhra Pradesh seats were changed to 11 and Telangana has had 7 seats since then. On 30 May 2014, draw was conducted amongst the existing 18 members select the 7 members of Telangana. In the draw, 3 members of Telugu Desam Party (TDP) and 4 members of Indian National Congress (INC) were selected.

State level

Legislative Assembly
{| class="wikitable sortable"
! Year
! Election
! Chief minister
! colspan="2" | Party
! Party-wise seats
! Opposition leader
|----
| 2014
| 2014 Telangana Assembly
| K. Chandrashekar Rao
| 
| Total: 119. BRS: 63, Congress: 21, TDP: 15, MIM: 7, BJP: 5, YCP: 3, BSP: 2, CPI: 1, CPM: 1, Independents: 1
| Kunduru Jana Reddy
|----
| 2018
| 2018 Telangana Assembly
| K. Chandrashekar Rao
| 
| Total: 119. BRS: 85, Congress: 19, MIM: 7, BJP: 3, TDP: 2, AIFB: 1, Independents: 1
| Vacant
|----
|-

|+ style="text-align: left;" |Telangana Legislative Assembly Election Results
|
|

The Telangana Legislative Assembly has 119 constituencies of which 18 are reserved for Scheduled Castes and 9 for Scheduled Tribes candidates. The first election to constitute the Legislative Assembly were held on 30 April 2014, prior to the formation of the state. The first phase of the elections were held in constituencies that would form the new state in June 2014. The results were declared on 16 May 2014 and Bharat Rashtra Samithi (BRS) won 63 seats and received the majority. K. Chandrashekar Rao, the founder of BRS was sworn in as the first Chief Minister of Telangana. The second Assembly elections were held on 7 December 2018 after Governor E. S. L. Narasimhan dissolved the assembly early on the advice of Rao. The results declared on 11 December 2018 indicated BRS maintaining the majority; this time winning 88 seats. Rao was again sworn in as the Chief Minister for second term.

Legislative Council

Political parties
Since its inception, the Telangana Rashtra Samithi has been the most dominant political party in the state, forming full majority governments in the state for two consecutive terms on its own. TRS was formed in 2001 with primary agenda of obtaining statehood for Telangana.

Other major political parties are:

National Parties
 Bahujan Samaj Party
 Bharatiya Janata Party
 Communist Party of India
 Communist Party of India (Marxist)
 Indian National Congress

State Parties
 All India Majlis-e-Ittehadul Muslimeen
 Telangana Rashtra Samithi
 Telugu Desam Party

Other Parties
 All India Forward Bloc
 Jana Sena Party

Issues 
As per the survey conducted by the NGO Association for Democratic Reforms, for the 2019 general election, unemployment remained the major issue amongst the voters in both urban and rural areas. For urban areas this was followed by noise pollution and in rural areas next immediate issues were noted to be better prices for farm products, and continuation of subsidy for seeds and fertilizers.

References 

Elections in Telangana